The 1896 United States presidential election in California took place on November 3, 1896 as part of the 1896 United States presidential election. State voters chose nine representatives, or electors, to the Electoral College, who voted for president and vice president.

California narrowly voted for the Republican nominee, Ohio Governor William McKinley, over the Democratic nominee, former Nebraska representative William Jennings Bryan.

Eight of the state's electoral votes were awarded to McKinley, while one was awarded to Bryan. This was the third occasion in which California's electoral vote was split, rather than being awarded to a single candidate. The previous two occasions 
were in 1880 and 1892. Such a split would only subsequently occur in California one more time (in 1912).

Results

Results by county

References

California
1896
1896 California elections